Maniac is an American short slasher film, directed by Shia LaBeouf. It was released for free on YouTube, on October 31, 2011. The short film stars American rappers Scott "Kid Cudi" Mescudi and Chris "Cage" Palko as French-speaking serial killers. Mescudi and Palko also co-wrote the film with LaBeouf.

Synopsis 
A filmmaker (Shia LaBeouf) documents the exploits of two serial killers (Scott Mescudi and Chris Palko).

Background 
Shia LaBeouf first directed a music video for New York-based rapper Cage in 2009, for his track "I Never Knew You": "I'm 22 and I'm directing my favorite rapper's music video," LaBeouf told LA Weekly of the project, "This shit is better than riding unicorns." It was through that project that he met Cleveland-bred rapper Kid Cudi, which led to LaBeouf filming and directing Kid Cudi's video for "Marijuana", which was shot at the 2010 High Times Cannabis Cup in Amsterdam. LaBeouf subsequently went on to collaborate with Cudi and Cage on a short film titled MANIAC. Kid Cudi first spoke of the short film on March 5, 2011, via his Twitter feed, when he announced: "[the] maniac horror short will be released on halloween, rager short this summer, marijuana video this spring. i got you guys, no worries."

The short film was inspired by Cudi's song of the same name, from his 2010 album Man on the Moon II: The Legend of Mr. Rager and is an homage to the 1992 Belgian black comedy crime mockumentary, Man Bites Dog. In an interview with Complex, Cudi went into detail about the short film, as he discussed how Shia LaBeouf reached out to him to do the project, playing the role of a killer, funding the video and why was it in French: "It was me creating the back story for this person in my mind. What you see just seems like senseless acts of crime happening but in my character’s mind it was always justified. When you watch it, it’s like, ‘Why are these things happening?’ You want answers but there's no answers really given. When I was in character, it was always justified for me." He also added "When it came time to shoot, it was as real as possible and you were scared of this character. I literally transformed into this person. I didn’t talk much on set, didn’t crack many jokes, I kept to myself."

Release
On June 3, 2011, Kid Cudi released the first trailer for the short film. On October 31, 2011, in the spirit of Halloween, Kid Cudi released the short film via YouTube.

Cast
Scott Mescudi as Twisted Killer
Chris Palko as Dark Killer
Shia LaBeouf as The Director
Ron Ayers as Sound Man
Ariel M. Carlson as Murdered Woman in Park
Jeremy Cook as Pedestrian
Erika Hoveland as Waitress
Bill Lumbert as French Diner Stud
Sydney Lumbert as Hallway Girl
Melissa Marra as Restaurant Patron
Eric Adam Swenson as Diner patron
Bryan Valko as Shotgun Murder Victim
Laurie Valko as Murder Victim
Johnny Marra as Restaurant Patron (uncredited)

References

External links
 
 

2011 short films
2011 films
2011 horror films
American black-and-white films
2010s French-language films
Films shot in Michigan
American serial killer films
American slasher films
2010s slasher films
American splatter films
American mockumentary films
Films set in France
Films about snuff films
French slasher films
French short films
American horror short films
Cage (rapper)
Kid Cudi
2010s American films
2010s French films